Mazarunia mazarunii is a species of cichlid endemic to Guyana, where it is found in the upper Mazaruni River.

References

Cichlid fish of South America
Fish of Guyana
Fish described in 1990
Taxa named by Sven O. Kullander
Geophagini